Bloomsburg Municipal Airport  is a public non-towered general aviation airport along the Susquehanna River within town limits on the south east corner of Bloomsburg.

Services: Columbia Aircraft Services, Inc.

Fuel: 100LL

Clubs: Parlor City Flying Club

References 

 Bloomsburg Municipal Airport (official web site)

External links

Airports in Pennsylvania
Transportation buildings and structures in Columbia County, Pennsylvania